Serb Muslims or Serb Mohammedans, also referred to as Čitaci, are ethnic Serbs who are Muslims (adherents of Islam) by their religious affiliation.

Use of the term Čitaci
The term has several particular uses:
In ethnographic, historical and comparative religious studies it is used as a designation for Islamized families of ethnic Serb descent.
It has been used as a self-identification (Čitaci) in former Yugoslavia.
It is used in historical studies to identify Ottoman people of Serb origin.
It is used for the Muslim population in the region of Sandžak (Serbia).

History

Since Serbs were, and still are, predominantly Eastern Orthodox Christians, their first significant historical encounter with Islam occurred in the second half of 14th century, and was marked by Turkish invasion and conquest of Serbian lands (starting in 1371 and ending by the beginning of 16th century). That interval was marked by first wave of Islamization among Serbs: in some regions, substantial minority left Christianity and converted into Islam, willingly or by necessity, under the influence of Ottoman authorities. The most notable Muslim of Serb ethnicity was Mehmed-paša Sokolović (1506-1579), Grand Vizier of the Ottoman Empire (1565-1579), who was ethnic Serb by birth, and so was Omar Pasha Latas.

Kingdom of Yugoslavia

Gajret

Gajret (known as Serbian Muslim Cultural Society after 1929) was a cultural society established in 1903 that promoted Serbian identity among the Slavic Muslims of Austria-Hungary (today's Bosnia and Herzegovina). The organization viewed that the Muslims were Serbs lacking ethnic consciousness. The view that Muslims were Serbs is probably the oldest of three ethnic theories among the Bosnian Muslims themselves. It was dismantled by the Independent State of Croatia during World War II. Some members, non-Communists, joined or collaborated with the Yugoslav Partisans, while others joined the Chetniks.

World War I

Muslims joined the Serbian army in World War I. The majority were Muslims who had a Serb identity, declaring as Serbs. Among notable soldiers were Mustafa Golubić, Avdo Hasanbegović, Šukrija Kurtović, Ibrahim Hadžimerović, Fehim Musakadić, Hamid Kukić, Rešid Kurtagić, who all fought as Serbian volunteer officers at the Salonica front. Among the most active in the group of Muslims who were engaged in Yugoslav propaganda on Austro-Hungarian Muslim POWs were A. Hasanbegović, Azis Sarić, F. Musakadić, Alija Džemidžić, R. Kurtagić, Asim Šeremeta, Hamid Kukić and Ibrahim Hadžiomerović.

World War II

During World War II in Yugoslavia, few Muslims joined the Chetniks. These espoused a Serb ethnic identity. The most notable of these was Ismet Popovac, who commanded the Muslim National Military Organization (Muslimanska narodna vojna organizacija, MNVO). The resolution of MNVO states that "Muslims are an integral part of Serbdom". World War I veteran Fehim Musakadić also joined the Chetniks.

SFR Yugoslavia

In the 1948 census, Muslims in Yugoslavia were allowed to declare as Muslims (ethnic group), the overwhelming majority choosing the option undetermined.

Some prominent Muslims in Yugoslavia openly declared as Serbs, such as writer Meša Selimović.

Yugoslav Wars

During early talks of the partition of Bosnia and Herzegovina, Ejup Ganić remarked that the Bosniaks "are Islamized Serbs", and should thus join the Serb side, at a time when the SDA shifted in favour of siding with the Serbs and continuing struggling against the Croats. Political analyst Jochen Hippler noted in 1994 that "Muslims are mostly ethnically Serb, a minority Croat, but this did not save them from being slaughtered by their fellow ethnic groups for being different."

Serb nationalists usually insisted that Bosnian Muslims were Serbs that had abandoned their faith. Serbian historiography emphasizes an Orthodox Serbian origin for the Bosniaks who are interpreted as relinquishing ties to that ethno-religious heritage after converting to Islam and later denying it by refusing to accept a Serbian identity. According to war and post-war Bosniak historiography, Bosnian Muslims within the bulk of Serbian nationalist historiography are presented as the descendants of the mentally ill, lazy, slaves, greedy landlords, prisoners, thieves, outcasts or as Serbs who confused and defeated chose to follow their enemies religion.  On the one hand, Bosnian Muslims emphasize that they have no ties with Serbs or Croats, while on the other hand, Serbs emphasize the common origin and role that the occupiers played in the quarrel between the Balkan peoples.

Censuses

Serbian censuses
In the 2014 census in Serbia, of those who declared as ethnic Serbs, 0.04% (2,816) declared Islam as their religion.

Notable people

Avdo Karabegović (1878–1908), Bosnian writer 
Osman Đikić (1879–1912), Bosnian writer 
Muhamed Mehmedbašić (1886–1943), Bosnian revolutionary 
Mustafa Golubić (1889–1941), Chetnik and Soviet intelligence officer 
Hasan Rebac, writer
Ismet Popovac (d. 1943), World War II Chetnik
Fehim Musakadić (d. 1943), World War I Serbian soldier and World War II Chetnik
Meša Selimović (1910–1982), Yugoslav writer
Emir Kusturica (b. 1954), Serbian filmmaker
Mustafa Mijajlović (b. 1972) Bosnian Serb sports commentator
Sulejman Spaho (b. 1949) Serbian politician

See also
Islam in Serbia

References

Sources

Further reading

Serb people
Slavic ethnic groups